Zane Rance Kapeli (born 28 September 1992) is a Tongan rugby union player who generally plays as a loose forward represents Tonga internationally and currently plays for club Bay of Plenty Steamers. He was included in the Tongan squad for the 2019 Rugby World Cup which is held in Japan for the first time and also marks his first World Cup appearance.

Career 
He made his international debut for Tonga against Georgia on 24 November 2018.

References

Extern links 
 

1992 births
Living people
Tongan rugby union players
Tonga international rugby union players
Rugby union players from Auckland
Moana Pasifika players
Rugby union locks
Rugby union flankers
Rugby union number eights
Waikato rugby union players
Bay of Plenty rugby union players
Highlanders (rugby union) players
Chiefs (rugby union) players